Zymal may refer to:
Zymal, host of Childhood with Zymal on Geo TV
Zymal, a proposed name for Pluto